Varat Eyalet (also known as Pashaluk of Varat or Province of Varat) was an administrative territorial entity of the Ottoman Empire formed in 1660. Varat Eyalet bordered Ottoman Budin Eyalet in the west, Temeşvar Eyalet in the southwest, Egir Eyalet in the northwest, vassal Ottoman Principality of Transylvania in the southeast, and Habsburg Royal Hungary in the north.

History
Varat (Oradea) was made the seat of an Ottoman governor (beylerbeyi) in 1660. Before the formation of the Eyalet, its area was mostly part of the vassal Ottoman Principality of Transylvania. Some territories that formerly belonged to Temeşvar Eyalet and Egir Eyalet were also included into Varat Eyalet.

In June 1692 the eyalet was conquered by the Habsburgs, and was ceded to Austria by Treaty of Carlowitz in 1699. Its territory was subsequently included into Habsburg Kingdom of Hungary and Habsburg Principality of Transylvania.

Administrative divisions
The sanjaks of Varat Eyalet in the 17th century:
 Sanjak of Varat (Oradea)
 Sanjak of Salanta (Salonta)
 Sanjak of Debreçin (Debrecen)
 Sanjak of Halmaş (Nagyhalász)
 Sanjak of Şenköy (Sâniob)

See also
Subdivisions of the Ottoman Empire

References

External links
Map

Ottoman period in Romania
Ottoman period in Hungary
Eyalets of the Ottoman Empire in Europe
States and territories established in 1660
1660 establishments in the Ottoman Empire
1692 disestablishments in the Ottoman Empire